The Mohammed VI satellites are a series of two Moroccan Earth observation and reconnaissance satellites, namely Mohammed VI-A and Mohammed VI-B, developed and built by Airbus Defence and Space and Thales Alenia Space based upon the Astrosat-1000 satellite bus. They are Morocco's first optical imaging satellites, and are operated by Morocco's Ministry of Defense, with an expected service life of 5 years. They are named after Mohammed VI, the King of Morocco.

Design

Satellite bus 
Both satellites are based on the Astrosat-1000 satellite bus.

Propulsion 
The satellites have four hydrazine thrusters for reboosting its orbit and keeping its altitude.

Launch

Mohammed VI-A 

The Mohammed VI-A satellite, Morocco's first spy satellite, was launched on Vega flight VV11 on board the Vega launcher from Guiana Space Centre ELA-1, French Guiana, on November 8, 2017. It was launched to low Earth Sun-synchronous orbit with an inclination of 97.9°.

Mohammed VI-B 

The Mohammed VI-B satellite, Morocco's second spy satellite, was launched a year later on Vega flight VV14 from Guiana Space Centre ELA-1, French Guiana, on November 28, 2018. It was launched to Low Earth Sun-synchronous orbit with an inclination of 97.9°.

See also 
List of Earth observation satellites

References 

Spacecraft launched in 2017
2017 in spaceflight
2018 in spaceflight
Spacecraft launched in 2018
Earth observation satellites
Military satellites
Satellites in low Earth orbit